Marte Harell (3 January 1907 – 12 March 1996) was an Austrian film actress. She was married to Karl Hartl.

Filmography

References

Bibliography
 Goble, Alan. The Complete Index to Literary Sources in Film. Walter de Gruyter, 1999.

External links

1907 births
1996 deaths
Austrian film actresses
Austrian television actresses
20th-century Austrian actresses
Actresses from Vienna